The Vermont State Colleges System (VSCS) is the system of public colleges in the U.S. state of Vermont. It was created by act of the Vermont General Assembly in 1961. There are presently four colleges in the VSCS consortium, they are: Castleton University, Community College of Vermont, Northern Vermont University, and the Vermont Technical College. Together, more than 11,000 students are enrolled in these colleges.

History
While VSCS, the state colleges' governing organization, was created in the mid-20th century, most of the component colleges are older. The state legislature first chartered Castleton University as a grammar school in 1787. Johnson State College was founded in 1828. The Vermont Technical College was founded in 1866. Lyndon State College was founded in 1911. Community College of Vermont, founded in 1970, was founded after the creation of the VSC. The newest institution, Northern Vermont University, was created in 2018 by merging Johnson State College and Lyndon State College together, combining administration but keeping the campuses separate.

The VSCS was headquartered at the Chancellors Office in Waterbury until August 2011 when Tropical Storm Irene forced it to relocate temporarily. After one year of temporary location at the Vermont Tech Enterprise Center in Randolph, the Chancellor's Office found a new, permanent home in Montpelier.

For many years, the Vermont public colleges have experienced financial stress and chronic underfunding.  Exacerbated by COVID-19, in April 2020, previous Vermont State Colleges system Chancellor Jeb Spaulding recommended closing the Vermont Technical College residential campus in Randolph as well as all operations/campuses of Northern Vermont University. This proposal was withdrawn and the state provided emergency "bridge" funding to the system in fall 2020. With the funding, the state put the system on a five-year plan to eliminate the system's structural deficit, unify Castleton University, Northern Vermont University, and Vermont Technical College into one university while keeping current campus locations open, and consolidate administrative services across the system. The Vermont State Colleges System Board of Trustees endorsed the plan in February 2021 and announced in September 2021 that the institutions would unify under the name Vermont State University on July 1, 2023.

Chancellors
Richard E. Bjork, 1978 – 1984
Charles I. Bunting, 1984–1999
Robert G. Clarke, 1999 – 2009
Timothy Donovan, 2009–2015
Jeb Spaulding, 2015–2020
Sophie Zdatny, 2020-Present

Organization
The Chancellor's office is the chief executive function of the system and performs day to day financial and policy operations. It is headed by Chancellor Sophie Zdatny. The system is overseen by the fifteen-member Board of Trustees and each of the state colleges has its own president and deans. 

Over eighty percent of VSCS students come from the state of Vermont. Students come from over forty other U.S. states, and more than forty-five countries. Class sizes are small, the average faculty to student ratio across the five colleges is 1:16. Nearly ninety percent of the faculty hold a Ph.D. or equivalent doctorate level terminal degree in their field of instruction.

References

External links
 

Vermont State Colleges
Public universities and colleges in Vermont
Liberal arts colleges in the United States
Public university systems in the United States
1961 establishments in Vermont